Ust-Reka is a rural locality (a selo) and the administrative center of Ustretskoye Rural Settlement, Syamzhensky District, Vologda Oblast, Russia. The population was 5 as of 2002. There are 4 streets.

Geography 
Ust-Reka is located 21 km west of Syamzha (the district's administrative centre) by road. Kuzminskaya is the nearest rural locality.

References 

Rural localities in Syamzhensky District
Kadnikovsky Uyezd